Daniel Gilbert (born January 17, 1962) is an American billionaire, businessman, and philanthropist. He is the co-founder and majority owner of Rocket Mortgage, founder of Rock Ventures, and owner of the National Basketball Association's Cleveland Cavaliers. Gilbert owns several sports franchises, including the American Hockey League's Cleveland Monsters, and the NBA G League's Cleveland Charge. He operates the Rocket Mortgage FieldHouse in Cleveland, Ohio, home to the Cavaliers and Monsters. As of January 2023, Forbes estimated his net worth at US$18.3 billion.

Early life and education
Gilbert was born to a Jewish family in Detroit, Michigan. He grew up in Southfield, Michigan, where he attended Southfield-Lathrup High School. He earned his bachelor's degree from Michigan State University and a Juris Doctor from Wayne State University Law School, and he is a member of the State Bar of Michigan. While in college he earned a real estate agent's license, and while in law school, he worked part-time at his parents' Century 21 Real Estate agency.

Business career

Rocket Mortgage
Gilbert founded Rock Financial in 1985 with Ron Berman, Lindsay Gross and his younger brother Gary Gilbert. In the late 1990s, the company launched its internet strategy, becoming an early online direct mortgage lender. In the fourth quarter of 2017, the company became the largest retail mortgage lender by volume in the United States.

In 2000, software maker Intuit Inc. purchased Rock Financial and renamed the national web operation Quicken Loans. In 2002, Gilbert and a group of private investors  purchased Quicken Loans and its affiliated national title company, Title Source, Inc., from Intuit. As of 2021, Gilbert served as the chairman of Quicken Loans, Inc.

In 2007, Gilbert and the city of Detroit announced an agreement to move the company's headquarters to downtown Detroit. All 3,600 Michigan-based employees moved into Detroit's urban core by the end of 2010.

In August 2020, Quicken Loans went public under the name Rocket Companies and made its debut on the New York Stock Exchange under the ticker symbol “RKT.” As of 2020, Gilbert remained the majority owner, controlling 79% of the company's shares.

Sports franchise ownership 

In 2005, Dan Gilbert bought the Cleveland Cavaliers for $375 million, which was then a record price for an NBA team. Since then, he has overseen significant improvements to the team's facilities and helped bring in top players like LeBron James.

In 2016, Gilbert also purchased the Cleveland Monsters, a professional ice hockey team in the American Hockey League. The team is affiliated with the NHL's Columbus Blue Jackets.

Gilbert has been an active and vocal owner, often speaking out on social media and in public about his teams and the NBA. He has also been involved in efforts to bring major sporting events to Cleveland, including the NBA All-Star Game and the NFL Draft.

Gilbert's ownership of the Cavaliers has been marked by both success and controversy. The team won its first NBA championship in 2016, but also went through a tumultuous period after LeBron James left in 2018. Additionally, Gilbert has faced criticism for his treatment of former head coach David Blatt and for his aggressive pursuit of tax incentives and public funding for his various business ventures in Cleveland.

Overall, however, Dan Gilbert's ownership of the Cleveland Cavaliers and the Cleveland Monsters has been a significant part of his business and investment portfolio, and he remains a prominent figure in both the NBA and the city of Cleveland.

Other businesses and investments
Gilbert is a founding partner in the private equity group Rockbridge Growth Equity LLC (RBE). The partnership invests in growing businesses in the financial services, Internet technology, consumer-direct marketing, and the sports and entertainment industries.

RBE has significant investments in Gas Station TV, Robb Report, and RapidAdvance, among other ventures.

Gilbert is also an investor in Courtside Ventures, a venture capital fund investing across early-stage technology and media companies with a focus on sports and is a founding partner of Detroit Venture Partners (DVP), a venture capital firm that funds start-up and early-stage technology companies based primarily in Detroit.[23] Some of the companies DVP has invested in includes LevelEleven, iRule and Marxent Labs.

Gilbert cofounded StockX, a stock market of things for high-demand, limited edition products such as sneakers. Gilbert is also invested and involved in the operation of several consumer-based technology-centered businesses, including Fathead, Veritix, Xenith, StyleCaster and Quizzle.

Gilbert launched nonprofit Bizdom in 2007, which promotes both tech and brick-and-mortar entrepreneurship in Detroit and Cleveland by supporting on-the-ground service providers.

In November 2009, Gilbert and a group of partners successfully backed a statewide referendum to bring casino gaming to Ohio's four largest cities. Through a joint venture with Caesars Entertainment Corporation, the groups operate urban-based casinos in both Cleveland and Cincinnati.  The first of the casinos, Jack Cleveland Casino, opened in May 2012.

In 2013, Rock Ventures, the umbrella entity for Gilbert's investments and real estate holdings, announced it had formed Athens Acquisition LLC, an affiliate of Rock Gaming, and acquired the majority interest in Greektown Superholdings Inc., owner of the Greektown Casino-Hotel located in downtown Detroit. In late 2018, Gilbert bought the online dictionaries, Dictionary.com and Thesaurus.com.

In November 2017, former professional Call of Duty player and 100 Thieves CEO Matthew "Nadeshot" Haag announced that Gilbert had made a multimillion-dollar investment into the esports organization.

Detroit initiatives 
Quicken Loans moved its headquarters and 1,700 of its employees to downtown Detroit in August 2010, where Gilbert and the company are helping lead a revitalization of Detroit's urban core.

Gilbert's Bedrock Detroit has purchased several buildings in downtown Detroit, including the historic Madison Theatre Building, Chase Tower, Two Detroit Center, Dime Building, the First National Building the David Stott Building and the former Federal Reserve Bank of Chicago Detroit Branch Building. Bedrock Detroit has also purchased several buildings on the city's Woodward Avenue, including One Woodward Avenue and the 1001 Woodward office tower.

In September 2013, Gilbert was named co-chair of the Blight Removal Task Force. The group published a detailed plan in May 2014 to remove all blighted structures and lots in the City of Detroit.

In 2015, he purchased Book Tower in Detroit.

A 2017 Politico Magazine article named Gilbert one of "America's 11 Most Interesting Mayors", listing him as though he were Mayor of Detroit due to his role in the city's development.

In September 2017, Detroit Mayor Mike Duggan appointed Gilbert to lead a committee to make a bid for online retail giant Amazon to bring its second North American headquarters to Detroit. In 2018, Amazon narrowed its list of potential headquarters locations, removing Detroit from its list of contenders.

Philanthropy and political donations 
In September 2012, Gilbert and his wife Jennifer joined The Giving Pledge, committing to give half of their wealth to philanthropy throughout their lifetimes.

Gilbert's eldest son was born with neurofibromatosis. Gilbert established two neurofibromatosis research clinics at the Children's National Medical Center (CNMC) in Washington, D.C. and at the Dana Children's Hospital at the Sourasky Medical Center in Tel Aviv, Israel. Gilbert also serves on the boards of the Children's Tumor Foundation, the Cleveland Clinic, and the Children's Hospital Foundation (an affiliate of CNMC); and is the vice-chairman of the not-for-profit M-1 RAIL initiative which is dedicated to promoting light-rail transportation in downtown Detroit.

In 2015, Gilbert donated $750,000 to the presidential candidacy of Chris Christie.

In September 2016, Gilbert donated $5 million to Wayne State University Law School. In October of that year,  Gilbert also donated $15 million toward the planned $50-million Breslin Center renovation project at Michigan State University.

In 2020, Gilbert made a $1.2 million donation to help COVID-19 relief efforts in the city of Detroit.

Personal life 
Gilbert resides in Michigan with his wife Jennifer Gilbert and their five children. His wife serves on the Gilbert Family Neurofibromatosis Institute at Children's National Medical Center in Washington, D.C. and also serves on the boards of ORT America and the Israeli and Overseas Committee of the Jewish Federation of Metropolitan Detroit. On May 26, 2019, Gilbert was taken to the hospital and treated for a stroke at the age of 57.

Awards and honors 
Gilbert's companies have achieved the following accolades under his watch:

Quicken Loans/Rocket Mortgage
 16-time winner: JD Power Highest Customer Satisfaction Award (10 for Primary Mortgage Origination, six for Mortgage Servicing)
 16-time Fortune 100 Best Companies to Work For (2005–2017)

Cleveland Cavaliers
 2016 NBA Champion
 2016 Best Team ESPY Award

Cleveland Monsters
 2016 Calder Cup Champion

References

External links 
 Dan Gilbert's Blog: Choose Thinking

1962 births
Living people
20th-century American businesspeople
21st-century American businesspeople
21st-century philanthropists
American billionaires
American casino industry businesspeople
American financial company founders
American real estate businesspeople
American technology chief executives
American technology company founders
American venture capitalists
Arena Football League executives
Businesspeople from Detroit
Cleveland Cavaliers owners
Cleveland Monsters
Giving Pledgers
Jewish American philanthropists
Michigan State University alumni
People from Southfield, Michigan
Rock Ventures
Wayne State University Law School alumni
21st-century American Jews